"Baby Goodbye" is a song by pop trio Friday Hill, released as the lead single from their debut studio album, Times Like These (2006). Despite being released under the name Friday Hill, the song is included as part of Blazin' Squad's discography. Released in October 2005, it debuted and peaked at number five on the UK Singles Chart.

Background
Following the split of ten-piece hip-hop group Blazin' Squad, band members Strider, Flava, and Kenzie were offered a record deal by Polydor records, to form as a trio and record an album together. The trio originally expressed the intention to continue performing as Blazin' Squad, however, due to licensing rights, the name was not available. As such, they decided to form under the name Friday Hill, which was created based around the trio's hometown of Chingford. The song is very much a departure from Blazin' Squad's style of music but was still successful commercially. Released on 10 October 2005, the single peaked at number five on the UK Singles Chart.

Music video
The music video for "Baby Goodbye" premiered in September 2005, at a total length of three minutes and thirty-nine seconds. The video was filmed entirely in black and white, and features shots of the band in and around a country house, with images of a girl they are singing to intertwined. The band's performance in very casual costumes was criticised, however, the video was still given strong airplay.

Track listings
 UK CD1
 "Baby Goodbye" (main mix)
 "Running Away" (demo)

 UK CD2
 "Baby Goodbye" (main mix)
 "Baby Goodbye" (main mix without rap)
 "Baby Goodbye" (acappella)
 "Baby Goodbye" (video)

Personnel
Personnel are lifted from the UK CD1 liner notes.
 Kenzie – writing (as James MacKenzie)
 Flava – writing (as James Murray)
 Strider – writing (as Mustafa Omer)
 Harry Wilkins – writing
 Si Hulbert – writing, guitar, production, engineering
 Simon Eyre – writing, guitar

Charts

Weekly charts

Year-end charts

References

External links
 baby goodbye friday hill lyrics

2005 singles
2005 songs
Blazin' Squad songs